This is a list of notable events in country music that took place in the year 1943.

Events 
 September – Decca Records is the first label to come to terms with the American Federation of Musicians, which had been on strike since August 1942 over music royalties. The first song that was released was "Pistol Packin' Mama" by Bing Crosby and the Andrews Sisters.
 October - Pistol Packin' Mama by Al Dexter goes where no "Hillbilly" record has ever gone, to the top of the National Best Selling Retail Records chart, on October 30. Dexter's publishing company sued "The Hit Parade" radio show for ignoring their record!
 Mother Maybelle Carter reformed the Carter Family. This time, she was joined by daughters Anita, June and Helen.

Top Hillbilly-Folk (Country) Recordings 1943

1941 was a great year for the United States recording industry, as bad memories of the Depression-tainted 1930s were replaced by record-setting sales. Then came Pearl Harbor, and on August 1, 1942, a strike by the American Federation of Musicians, which ended all recording sessions. Record companies kept business going by releasing promising recordings from their vaults, but by mid-1943, alternate sources were running dry, as the strike continued. Decca was the first company to settle with the union in September, but year-end statistics showed a 50% drop in charted records from 1942. Scan down the "recorded"(date) column, you won't see 1943 very often.

"Pistol Packin' Mama" by Al Dexter was easily the top record of the year, becoming the first #1 Hillbilly-Folk record to cross over and reach #1 on the Popular Chart as well. 1943 featured two of the greatest double-sided Country records ever, "PPM/Rosalita" by Dexter, and the close runner-up, "No Letter Today / Born To Lose" by Ted Daffan, also a top ten crossover hit. Both records stayed on the Hillbilly-Folk chart for over a year, and all four sides made the Popular chart too.

The Top Hillbilly-Folk Records of the Year chart is, like 1942, mostly derived from The Billboard's weekly "American Folk Records" columns of 1943, with raw reports from nationwide jukebox operators, and summaries of the top records in the nation. Supplemental information came from 'Joel Whitburn's Pop Memories 1890-1954', record sales reported on the "Discography of American Historical Recordings" website, and other sources as specified. As always, numerical rankings are approximate.

Because of the lack of fresh material, many hits from past years made chart returns.

Births 
 February 4 – Jimmy Johnson, American musician (Muscle Shoals Rhythm Section) and record producer (died 2019).
 April 23 – Richard Sterban, member of the country-gospel group The Oak Ridge Boys (he's the bass).
 April 29 – Duane Allen, member of the country-gospel group The Oak Ridge Boys (he's the second tenor).
 October 11 – Gene Watson, honky tonk-styled vocalist of the 1970s and 1980s.

Deaths

References

Further reading 
 Kingsbury, Paul, "Vinyl Hayride: Country Music Album Covers 1947–1989," Country Music Foundation, 2003
 Millard, Bob, "Country Music: 70 Years of America's Favorite Music," HarperCollins, New York, 1993
 Whitburn, Joel. "Joel Whitburn's Pop Memories 1890–1954: The History of American Popular Music," Record Research Inc., Menomonee Falls, Wisconsin, 1986.

Country
Country music by year